The Minister of Finance is the head of the Ministry of Finance and Economic Affairs of the Government of Tanzania.

List of Ministers
The following have served the ministry:
 Parties

References